Titanus is an Italian film production company, founded in 1904 by Gustavo Lombardo (1885–1951). The company's headquarters are located at 28 Via Sommacampagna, Rome and its studios on the Via Tiburtina, 13 km from the centre of Rome.

Lombardo ran the studios until his death in 1951. His son, Goffredo Lombardo (1920–2005) and later his grandson, Guido Lombardo have continued to run the company.

The company has been responsible for hundreds of Italian productions. Titanus made many peplum films and comedies featuring Totò and Franco and Ciccio.  The film The Shortest Day was not only a parody of The Longest Day but featured a galaxy of stars who made the film to help the studio. The studio made numerous international co-productions with American (Sodom and Gomorrah, The Angel Wore Red) and French (Plein Soleil) film studios.

After the arrival of the French new wave films, Titanus launched a "youth operation", which gave young film artists a chance to create low-budget films with relative freedom. This had approximately 100 first and second productions for Titanus made between 1960 and 1965. This included films by new directors such as Ermanno Olmi, Elio Petri, Damiano Damiani and Lina Wertmuller. Titanus closed down its production branch in 1964.

After a hiatus of approximately ten years, Titanus reorganized and resumed film production on a smaller scale.  Despite a few false starts, the company seemed to be back on its feet by the late 1980s, though, now, most of its work is being done for television.

Selected films 

 L'avvenire in agguato directed by Giulio Antamoro (1916)
 L'ombra directed by Mario Caserini (1917)
 Il piacere directed by Amleto Palermi (1918)
 Io ti uccido! directed by Giulio Antamoro (1919)
 Friquet directed by Gero Zambuto (1919)
 Vautrin directed by Alexandre des Varennes (1919)
 Il castello di bronzo directed by Emilio Ghione (1920)
 I figli di nessuno (1951)
 Il Cappotto (1952)
 Rome 11:00 (1952)
 Storms (1953)
 Pane, amore e fantasia (1953)
 Pane, amore e gelosia (1954)  
 Siamo donne (1953)
 Il segno di Venere (1955)
 Il bidone (1955)
 Pane, amore e... (1955)
 Il Tetto (1956)
 Poveri ma belli (1957)
 Arrivederci Roma (1958)
 The Naked Maja (1958)
 Il magistrato (1959)
 The Law (1959)
 Estate violenta (1959)
 À double tour (1959)
 Plein soleil (1960)
 The Angel Wore Red (1960)
 Le Trou (1960)
 A Breath of Scandal (1960)
 Rocco e i suoi fratelli (1960)
 Audace colpo dei soliti ignoti (1960)
 Il Posto (1961)
 La viaccia (1961)
 Girl with a Suitcase (1961)
 A cavallo della tigre (1961)
 Les Sept péchés capitaux (1962)
 Il giorno più corto (1962)
 Le quattro giornate di Napoli (1962)
 Family Diary (1962)
 I Sequestrati di Altona (The Condemned of Altona, 1962) 
 Il Gattopardo (1963)
 Sodom and Gomorrah (1963)
 I Fidanzati (1963)
 The Tigers of Mompracem (1970)
 La prima notte di quiete (1972)
 Sinbad and the Caliph of Baghdad (1973)
 Help Me Dream (1981)
 Dagger Eyes (1983)

See also 

 List of Italian companies

References

Footnotes